Karlov (Cyrillic: Карлов) is a Slavic masculine surname that originates from the given name Carl. Its feminine counterpart is Karlova. Notable people with the surname include:

Andrei Karlov (1954–2016), Russian diplomat 
Boris Karlov (1924–1964), Bulgarian accordionist
Georgy Karlov (born 1971), Russian politician
Larysa Karlova (born 1958), Ukrainian handball player
Sonia Karlov (1908–?), American dancer and actress
Uğur Rıfat Karlova (born 1980), Turkish-Taiwanese stand-up comedian, actor, TV host and writer
Yevgeny Karlov

See also

Karlo (name)
Karlos (name)
Karlow (name)

References

Surnames from given names
Surnames of Slavic origin